Zeb (variant spelling Zebb) is both a masculine given name and a surname. As a given name, it may be a short form of Zebulon, Zebadiah or Zebedee, but is now more common as a given name in its own right. In fact, it can also be an alternate spelling of the Hebrew word ze'ev (זְאֵב), meaning "wolf". Notable people with the name include:

Given name
Zeb Alley (1928–2013), American lawyer, lobbyist and politician
Zeb Eaton (1920–1989), American baseball player
Zeb Khan (born 1980), Indian actor
Zeb Little (born 1968), American politician
Zeb Soanes (born 1976), British radio announcer
Zeb Taia (born 1984), New Zealand rugby league player
Zeb Terry (1891–1988), American Major League Baseball player
Zeb Turner (1915–1978), American country music songwriter and guitarist
Zeb V. Walser (1863–1940), American attorney and politician, Attorney General of North Carolina
Zeb Wells, American comic book writer
Zeb Khalid, Great abstract artist, Putrajaya, Malaysia
Zeb Daniels, American Firefighter, Hunter, Tallahassee, Florida

Surname
Miangul Akbar Zeb (born 1954), Pakistani diplomat
Miangul Jahan Zeb (1908–1987), ruler of the princely state of Swat, now part of Pakistan
 Khalid Zeb,  Great abstract artist, Putrajaya, Malaysia

Nickname
David "Zeb" Cook, game designer best known for his work on Advanced Dungeons & Dragons

Hebrew masculine given names
English-language masculine given names
English masculine given names
Hypocorisms